The 2007 WSBL season was the 19th season of the Women's State Basketball League (SBL). The regular season began on Friday 30 March and ended on Saturday 4 August. The finals began on Friday 10 August and ended on Friday 7 September, when the Perry Lakes Hawks defeated the Stirling Senators in the WSBL Grand Final.

Regular season
The regular season began on Friday 30 March and ended on Saturday 4 August after 18 rounds of competition.

Standings

Finals
The finals began on Friday 10 August and ended on Friday 7 September with the WSBL Grand Final.

Bracket

Awards

Statistics leaders

Regular season
 Most Valuable Player: Christine Boyd (Perth Redbacks)
 Coach of the Year: Rick Morcom (Perry Lakes Hawks)
 Most Improved Player: Jessica Bone (Lakeside Lightning)
 All Star First Team:
 Tanya Kelly (Perry Lakes Hawks)
 Myra Donkin (Lakeside Lightning)
 Carly Wilson (Stirling Senators)
 Liz Cooke (Stirling Senators)
 Christine Boyd (Perth Redbacks)
 All Star Second Team:
 Casey Mihovilovich (Mandurah Magic)
 Melissa Marsh (Willetton Tigers)
 Emma Pass (Cockburn Cougars)
 Carli Boyanich (Perry Lakes Hawks)
 Shelly Boston (Rockingham Flames)
 All Star Third Team:
 Tegan Walker (Geraldton Buccaneers)
 Sue Williams (Willetton Tigers)
 Jessica Spinner (Wanneroo Wolves)
 Kaye Tucker (Mandurah Magic)
 Jessica Bone (Lakeside Lightning)

Finals
 Grand Final MVP: Carli Boyanich (Perry Lakes Hawks)

References

External links
 2007 SBL season at sbl.asn.au
 2007 fixtures
 2007 finals schedule
 2007 quarter-finals wrap and semi-finals schedule

2007
2006–07 in Australian basketball
2007–08 in Australian basketball